The Trofeo Kima (Kima Trophy), is an international skyrunning competition held for the first time in 1995. It runs every year (till 2007), in Val Masino (Italy) in August and is valid for the Skyrunner World Series in the Sky Extreme category.

From 2008 Kima became a biennial race.

History
Since 1995, along the Sentiero Roma, runs the Trofeo Kima, a high altitude marathon considered one of the most demanding of the skyrunning world panorama. The trophy is dedicated to the memory of Pierangelo Marchetti "Kima", the mountain guide of Valtellina, who died in 1994 during a rescue mission.

The route takes place on a distance of 50 kilometers with more than 3800 meters of altitude difference. The winners take the entire route, counter-clockwise, starting and arriving at Filorera, in about 6 hours and 30 minutes.

Editions
Sky Extreme characteristics: 52 km and 4,200 m climbing.

Legend: *Short course

See also 
 Skyrunner World Series

References

External links 
 Official web site

Skyrunning competitions
Skyrunner World Series
1995 establishments in Italy
Recurring sporting events established in 1995
Sport in Lombardy
Athletics competitions in Italy